The Reno Rules were ethical rules for federal prosecutors promulgated in the Code of Federal Regulations by then Attorney General Janet Reno. The rules, despite their issuance, lacked statutory authority and were unenforceable. See United States v. McDonnell Douglas Corp., 132 F.3d 1252 (8th Cir. 1998). The rules were passed in the wake of discussions about the Thornburgh Memo. They have since been supplanted by 28 U.S.C. § 530B.

Law of the United States
United States Department of Justice